"Take It Back" is a song written by Kristy Jackson, and recorded by American country music artist Reba McEntire.  It was released in October 1992 as the first single from her album. It's Your Call.  The song reached #5 on the Billboard Hot Country Singles & Tracks chart in February 1993.

Music video
The song's video was directed by Jon Small and released in late 1992. Set in a courtroom, it features actor and comedy writer Pat McCormick playing a courtroom judge. The song actually starts about a minute into the video, after the judge calls Reba up to testify against her witness (who is accused of cheating on her) She angrily throws things at him in anger, and the courtroom eventually starts to dance as the sax solo plays. In the end, Reba wins the case and angrily storms out of the room, as the defendant shakes hands with the judge.

Chart performance
The song debuted at #57 on the US Billboard Hot Country Singles chart for the week of November 21, 1992, and it peaked at #5 for the week of February 13, 1993

Year-end charts

References

1992 singles
Reba McEntire songs
Song recordings produced by Tony Brown (record producer)
MCA Records singles
1992 songs
Music videos directed by Jon Small